Dehdasht (also Romanized as Dehdast; also known as Kuhgiluyeh) is a city in and the capital of Kohgiluyeh County, Kohgiluyeh and Boyer-Ahmad Province, Iran. At the 2006 census, its population was 49,995, in 9,628 families.

See also 
 Seyyed Nasir Hosseini (the Imam of Friday Prayer)

References

Populated places in Kohgiluyeh County

Cities in Kohgiluyeh and Boyer-Ahmad Province